Kurikka is a town and municipality of Finland. It is located in the province of Western Finland and is part of the Southern Ostrobothnia region. The municipality is unilingually Finnish.

Kurikka is one of the biggest shareholders in the Finnish energy giant Fortum as well as in Neste Oil, one of Northern Europe's biggest oil companies. The political scene of the town is dominated by the Finnish Centre because of the agricultural roots and past of the town.

The municipality of Jurva was consolidated to Kurikka on 1 January 2009 and municipality of Jalasjärvi on 1 January 2016.

Transport
The private coach company OnniBus route Helsinki—Seinäjoki—Vaasa has a stop at Jalasjärvi.

Notable people
Arsi Harju (born 1974), shot putter, olympic gold medalist 2000
Juha Mieto (born 1949), former cross country skier
Jorma Ollila (born 1950), Nokia and Royal Dutch Shell chairman of the board

International relations

Twin towns — Sister cities
Kurikka is twinned with:

  Ockelbo Municipality, Sweden  
  Melhus, Norway
  Holmegaard, Denmark

References

External links
 
 Town of Kurikka – Official website

 
Cities and towns in Finland
Populated places established in 1868